Denise Guénard (born Laborie; 13 January 1934 – 23 May 2017 at Saint-Maurice-the-Girard (Vendée) was a French athlete who specialized in the combined events.

Biography 
She won the silver medal in the pentathlon during the 1962 European Athletics Championships, at Belgrade, with a total of 4,735 points, beaten that day by the Soviet Galina Bystrova.

Guénard was an extremely versatile athlete since she won a total of 20 individual events at French National championships in five different disciplines: the 80 metres hurdles, the high jump, the long jump, the discus throw, and the pentathlon.

She was selected 47 times for French national athletic teams.

Guénard died on 23 May 2017, aged 83.

Awards 
  Silver medal in the European championships for the pentathlon in 1962
   Champion of France in 80 metre hurdles: 1954, 1955, 1960, 1961, 1962 and 1965
   France champion in the high jump: 1953, 1964
  France champion in the long jump: 1965 and 1966
   Champion of France in the discus throw: 1959 
   French champion in the pentathlon: 1953, 1954, 1961, 1963, 1964, 1965, 1966, 1967 and 1968
  Participation in three Olympics: 1952, 1960 and 1964 (8th in the 4 × 100 metre women's relay in Tokyo); and in three European Championships: 1954 (4th in the 80 metre hurdles), 1962, and 1966 (8th in pentathlon)

Notes and references 

 Revus athlétisme L'Équipe Magazine, no 24  4 December 1970

External links 
 

1934 births
2017 deaths
French female long jumpers
French female triple jumpers
French female high jumpers
French pentathletes
French female discus throwers
Olympic athletes of France
Athletes (track and field) at the 1952 Summer Olympics
Athletes (track and field) at the 1960 Summer Olympics
Athletes (track and field) at the 1964 Summer Olympics
French female hurdlers